The Grand Prix Hydraulika Mikolasek was a single-day road cycling race held annually in Slovakia from 2005 to 2010. It was part of UCI Europe Tour as a category 1.2 event. In 2005, the race was titled GP Jamp.

Winners

References

Cycle races in Slovakia
Recurring sporting events established in 2005
Recurring sporting events disestablished in 2010
2005 establishments in Slovakia
2010 disestablishments in Slovakia
UCI Europe Tour races
Defunct cycling races in Slovakia